Neriene is a genus of sheet weavers that was first described by John Blackwall in 1833.

Species
 it contains sixty species, found in Africa, Asia, Europe, North America, and on Greenland:
N. albolimbata (Karsch, 1879) – Russia (Far East), China, Korea, Taiwan, Japan
N. amiculata (Simon, 1905) – Indonesia (Java)
N. angulifera (Schenkel, 1953) – Russia (Far East), China, Japan
N. aquilirostralis Chen & Zhu, 1989 – China
N. baywanga (Barrion & Litsinger, 1995) – Philippines
N. beccarii (Thorell, 1890) – Indonesia (Sumatra)
N. birmanica (Thorell, 1887) – India, Myanmar, Laos, China, Indonesia (Bali)
N. brongersmai van Helsdingen, 1969 – Japan
N. calozonata Chen & Zhu, 1989 – China
N. cavaleriei (Schenkel, 1963) – China, Vietnam
N. chunan Yin, 2012 – China
N. circifolia Zhao & Li, 2014 – China
N. clathrata (Sundevall, 1830) (type) – North America, Europe, North Africa, Caucasus, Russia (Europe to Far East), Central Asia, China, Korea, Japan
N. comoroensis Locket, 1980 – Comoros
N. compta Zhu & Sha, 1986 – China
N. conica (Locket, 1968) – Angola, Rwanda, Kenya
N. coosa (Gertsch, 1951) – Russia (Sakhalin), USA
N. decormaculata Chen & Zhu, 1988 – China
N. digna (Keyserling, 1886) – USA, Canada, Alaska
N. emphana (Walckenaer, 1841) – Europe, Caucasus, Russia (Europe to Far East), Central Asia, China, Korea, Japan
N. flammea van Helsdingen, 1969 – South Africa
N. furtiva (O. Pickard-Cambridge, 1871) – Europe, North Africa, Russia (Europe to South Siberia)
N. fusca (Oi, 1960) – Japan
N. guanga (Barrion & Litsinger, 1995) – Philippines
N. gyirongana Hu, 2001 – China
N. hammeni (van Helsdingen, 1963) – Netherlands, Belgium, France, Germany, China?
N. helsdingeni (Locket, 1968) – Africa
N. herbosa (Oi, 1960) – China, Japan
N. japonica (Oi, 1960) – Russia (Far East), China, Korea, Japan
N. jinjooensis Paik, 1991 – China, Korea, Japan
N. kartala Jocqué, 1985 – Comoros
N. katyae van Helsdingen, 1969 – Sri Lanka
N. kibonotensis (Tullgren, 1910) – West, Central, East Africa
N. kimyongkii (Paik, 1965) – Korea
N. limbatinella (Bösenberg & Strand, 1906) – Russia (Far East), China, Korea, Japan
N. litigiosa (Keyserling, 1886) – North America. Introduced to China
N. longipedella (Bösenberg & Strand, 1906) – Russia (Far East), China, Korea, Japan
N. lushanensis Li, Liu & Chen, 2018 – China
N. macella (Thorell, 1898) – India, China, Myanmar, Thailand, Laos, Malaysia (mainland), Indonesia (Sumatra), Philippines
N. marginella (Oi, 1960) – Japan
N. montana (Clerck, 1757) – Europe, Caucasus, Russia (Europe to Far East), Central Asia, Japan
N. natalensis van Helsdingen, 1969 – South Africa
N. nitens Zhu & Chen, 1991 – China
N. obtusa (Locket, 1968) – Africa
N. obtusoides Bosmans & Jocqué, 1983 – Cameroon
N. oidedicata van Helsdingen, 1969 – Russia (Far East), China, Korea, Japan
N. orthocera Li, Liu & Chen, 2018 – China
N. oxycera Tu & Li, 2006 – Laos, Thailand, Vietnam
N. peltata (Wider, 1834) – Greenland, Europe, Caucasus, Russia (Europe to South Siberia)
N. poculiforma Liu & Chen, 2010 – China
N. radiata (Walckenaer, 1841) – North America, Europe, Turkey, Caucasus, Russia (Europe to Far East), Kazakhstan, China, Korea, Japan
N. redacta Chamberlin, 1925 – Southeastern United States (Missouri, Florida)
N. strandia (Blauvelt, 1936) – China, Borneo
N. subarctica Marusik, 1991 – Russia (Middle Siberia to Far East)
N. sundaica (Simon, 1905) – Indonesia (Java, Lombok)
N. tiniktirika (Barrion & Litsinger, 1995) – Philippines
N. variabilis (Banks, 1892) – USA
N. yani Chen & Yin, 1999 – China
N. zanhuangica Zhu & Tu, 1986 – China
N. zhui Chen & Li, 1995 – China (Hainan)

See also
 List of Linyphiidae species (I–P)
Frontinella

References

Araneomorphae genera
Linyphiidae
Spiders of Africa
Spiders of Asia
Spiders of North America
Taxa named by John Blackwall